Murder in Eden is a British television crime drama miniseries, consisting of three fifty-minute episodes, that first broadcast on 19 July 1991 on BBC1. The series stars Alun Armstrong as Sergeant McGing, a police officer in rural County Donegal who investigates when Tim Roarty (Tony Doyle), the landlord of a local pub, murders his barman after being blackmailed by one of the other inhabitants of the village. While the police are busy hunting for the killer, parts of the victim's body continue to resurface. The miniseries was written by Shane Connaughton and directed by Nicholas Renton.

The series was based on the novel Bogmail by author Patrick McGinley, first published in 1978. The series was filmed in and around the Glencolmcille and Teelin areas in 1990. The series co-starred Ian Bannen and Peter Firth as quarrelling neighbours Canon Loftus and Kenneth Potter. In 2016, just short of twenty-five years after it first aired, Murder in Eden was uploaded in full to YouTube, thought to be first time it had resurfaced since its original broadcast. Notably, it has yet to be released on DVD.

Cast
 Peter Firth as Kenneth Potter 
 Ian Bannen as Canon Loftus 
 Alun Armstrong as Sergeant McGing 
 Tara MacGowran as Nora Hession 
 Tony Doyle as Tim Roarty 
 Tina Kellegher as Susan 
 Garrett Keogh as Gimp Gillespie
 Sean Lawlor as Rory Rua 
 Frankie McCafferty as Cor Mogaill 
 Breffni McKenna as Eamonn Eales 
 Trevor Moore as Postman 
 Maeve Connelly as Cecily
 P.G. Stephens as Dr. McGorrigle
 Birdy Sweeney as Crubog

Episodes

References

External links
 

1990s British drama television series
BBC television dramas
Television shows set in the Republic of Ireland
1991 British television series debuts
1991 British television series endings
1990s British television miniseries
English-language television shows